The 2003 Tennessee Titans season was the team's 44th season and their 34th in the National Football League. At 12–4 the Titans posted the 15th season with at least ten wins in the franchise's history dating to their Houston Oilers days. Quarterback Steve McNair threw for 3,215 yards and 24 touchdowns to just seven interceptions; he also rushed for 138 yards and four touchdowns, all despite missing two games to injury, and was named the NFL's co-MVP with Peyton Manning of the Titans' division arch-rival Indianapolis Colts. Eddie George rushed for 1,031 yards and five touchdowns while Derrick Mason had 1,303 receiving yards and eight touchdowns. Justin McCareins had 586 punt/kick return yards and a return touchdown.

This was the last season that the Titans won a playoff game until 2017.

Personnel

Staff

Roster

Schedule

Preseason

Regular season 

Note: Division opponents are in bold text

Standings

Game summaries

Week 1 vs. Oakland Raiders 

In a rematch of the 2002 AFC Title Game the Titans got a measure of revenge in a game that featured 28 combined penalties (17 by the notoriously penalty-prone Raiders). The Titans took an early 9–3 lead on a Tyrone Calico touchdown catch (with a missed PAT) and 50-yard field goal from ex-Raider Joe Nedney while the kicker who replaced Nedney in Oakland, Sebastian Janikowski, drilled a 47-yarder in the first quarter. Nedney himself was injured during the game, so Craig Hentrich came off the bench and booted three additional field goals for the Titans. The Raiders kept the game close as Steve McNair managed two touchdown throws and Rich Gannon added two for the Raiders, but Hentrich's 33-yard boot in the final minute sealed a 25–20 Titans win.

Week 2 at Indianapolis Colts 

Peyton Manning defeated the Titans for the first time in three career starts in a 33–7 rout. Mike Vanderjagt kicked four field goals and Nick Harper snatched a Steve McNair INT and ran it back 75 yards for a fourth-quarter touchdown. The loss put the Titans in an early hole in the AFC South division race.

Week 3 vs. New Orleans Saints

Week 4 at Pittsburgh Steelers 

McNair missed only one throw in sixteen attempts, compiling 161 passing yards and three touchdowns. Rocky Boiman added his own touchdown in the fourth quarter by returning a Tommy Maddox interception 60 yards. The Titans triumphed 30–13.

Week 5 at New England Patriots 

One of the most ferocious games of the season for both clubs, the game lead changed on almost every possession. Two Titans field goals (by Craig Hentrich and Gary Anderson) in the first were followed by a 58-yard Tom Brady touchdown to Troy Brown. Adam Vinatieri missed two field goal tries while Anderson also missed, leaving the halftime score 13–7 Tennessee, but from the start of the second half the two teams erupted as the Patriots behind 153 rushing yards by Antowain Smith and reserve back Mike Cloud scored on all five second-half possessions. McNair rushed in two touchdowns to go with a total of four Anderson field goals, but following McNair's second rushing score and two-point pass to Tyrone Calico a 71-yard Bethel Johnson kick return led to a Mike Cloud touchdown. With the Patriots leading 31–27 McNair was picked off by a hobbled Ty Law for a 65-yard Patriots touchdown. The final Anderson field goal was followed by an onside kick recovered by the Patriots for a 38–30 Titans loss.

Week 6 vs. Houston Texans 

In the first of the two teams' semi-annual "Houston Oilers Bowls" matchups the Titans honored former Oilers defensive end Elvin Bethea during halftime. McNair threw for a career-high 421 yards and three touchdowns in a 38–17 rout of the Texans. David Carr of Houston threw two touchdowns but was picked off three times and Andre Dyson returned one pick for a 51-yard Titans score.

Week 7 at Carolina Panthers 

A week after the Panthers ended the unbeaten streak of the Indianapolis Colts, the Titans ended Carolina's own win streak in a 37–17 runaway. After rushing in a seven-yard touchdown in the first quarter, Steve McNair gave way to backup Billy Volek on a fake punt; Volek took the snap and threw a 50-yard score to Eddie Berlin. McNair returned to the game and added a touchdown throw to Drew Bennett and Keith Bulluck ran in a 23-yard fumble for a touchdown. Jake Delhomme of the Panthers managed two touchdown throws in his first loss as Panthers starter.

Week 8 at Jacksonville Jaguars

Week 10 vs. Miami Dolphins 

The Titans forced three interceptions from Dolphins quarterback Brian Griese and also recovered two Dolphins fumbles en route to a 31–7 win. McNair had two touchdown throws and 223 yards passing while the lone Dolphins score came from future Texans quarterback Sage Rosenfels on a fourth-quarter score to Donald Lee.

Week 11 vs. Jacksonville Jaguars 

After seven straight games where they scored at least 27 points (six straight with at least 30), the Titans were held to just ten points in a 10–3 win over the Jaguars and their first home game against Jack Del Rio as Jacksonville coach. Gary Anderson booted a 33-yard field goal and Justin McCareins caught a five-yard score from McNair. Jacksonville was limited to a Seth Marler field goal in the fourth as Byron Leftwich was sacked six times and threw two picks.

Week 12 at Atlanta Falcons 

In their first trip to the Georgia Dome since Super Bowl XXXIV the Titans surrendered 21 first-quarter points on an Allen Rossum punt return, a T. J. Duckett rushing score, and a Doug Johnson throw caught by Warrick Dunn at the Falcons 20 and run in for an 86-yard touchdown. But in the second the Falcons dropped a punt at their five-yard line and the Titans recovered; McNair then rifled a touchdown to Frank Wycheck, but had to leave the game with a strained calf. Billy Volek threw for 117 yards and one touchdown while Eddie George rushed for 115 yards and a score, ultimately securing a 38–31 Titans win, the club's largest comeback win since the 1978 Oilers season.

Week 13 at New York Jets 

With an epic 38–34 loss to the Patriots the day before, the Indianapolis Colts gave the Titans an opening to take the division lead, but on Monday Night Football against the 4–7 Jets the Titans came out flat at The Meadowlands. Future Jet Justin McCareins caught a 59-yard touchdown from Steve McNair in the first quarter, but from there the Jets behind Chad Pennington erupted, scoring 24 points over the next three quarters. The Titans were stopped on downs when McNair tried to rifle a pass on 4th and 3 at the Jets goalline, and later clawed to 24–17 in the final 1:52 but the Jets recovered the ensuing onside kick. McNair competed despite the strained calf from the previous week and was 21 of 35 for 272 yards, two touchdowns, and two picks.

Week 14 vs. Indianapolis Colts 

Following losses to AFC East teams the week before the 9–3 Colts and 9–3 Titans squared off for the division lead. Five Mike Vanderjagt field goals helped the Colts build a 29–13 fourth-quarter lead, but the Titans stormed back with McNair touchdowns to Robert Holcombe and Derrick Mason; Mason's score came with 2:52 to go in regulation, but a two-point conversion was stopped when the Colts swatted down a McNair throw. The Colts killed the clock afterward for a 29–27 Titans loss that ended any hope of the division title.

Week 15 vs. Buffalo Bills 

A failed two-point conversion wound up deciding the outcome of a Titans game for the second straight week. Lingering injuries to McNair put Billy Volek into the starting role for this game. The Buffalo Bills erupted to a 17–6 third quarter lead, but Volek threw two touchdowns and ran in a third as the Titans took a 28–20 lead late in the fourth. Drew Bledsoe led the Bills down the field and threw a six-yard touchdown strike to Mark Campbell with 24 seconds to go in regulation, but the two-point try was dropped in the endzone, and the ensuing onside kick was recovered by the Titans, ending a 28–26 Tennessee win.

 December 21 at Houston Texans:
McNair's final start of the regular season turned into a hard-fought back-and-forth affair as the Texans strove for their first win over the team that left Houston after 1996. In the third quarter Marlon McCree ran back a McNair pick 95 yards for a touchdown (10–10 score), then the Texans fumbled the ball and Samari Rolle ran in a 61-yard Titans score (17–10 Titans). A Domanick Williams touchdown run with 2:48 to go in the fourth put Houston up 24–20, but McNair led the Titans down the field and threw the game-winning 23-yard score to Drew Bennett with 17 seconds remaining and a 27–24 Titans final.

 December 28 vs. Tampa Bay Buccaneers:
|Weather= 63 °F (Mostly Cloudy)
Tampa's nightmarish season as defending Super Bowl champions finally ended in a 33–13 humiliation. Titans backup Neil O'Donnell was the starter and threw for 232 yards and two touchdowns. Brad Johnson of the Bucs threw three interceptions and backup Shaun King added a fourth and in the fourth also fumbled the ball in his endzone for a Titans score. Eddie George broke 10,000 career rushing yards in this game.

Playoffs game summaries 
 AFC Wildcard Playoffs at Baltimore Ravens:
Turnovers were an order of the night as Steve McNair was picked off three times – Will Demps of the Ravens caught an Ed Reed deflection and ran back a first-quarter INT for a 56-yard tying touchdown – and Ravens quarterback Anthony Wright threw two picks. Eddie George suffered a dislocated shoulder on a tackle of Reed, but returned to the game. The Titans limited Jamal Lewis to 35 rushing yards (the entire Ravens squad managed just 54) and built a 17–10 fourth quarter lead before Wright tied the game with a 35-yard score to Todd Heap with 4:30 left in regulation. McNair led the Titans down the field and ran down enough clock that the game-winning Gary Anderson field goal (46 yards) came with 29 seconds left. The Titans advanced to the Divisional round with the 20–17 win, their first over their former AFC Central rival in six tries. Until the 2017 season, this was the last time the Titans won in the playoffs and this would go down as Steve McNair's last playoff win in the NFL. It proved the last playoff win for head coach Jeff Fisher as well, either with the Titans or his later stint coaching the Rams.

 AFC Divisional Playoffs at New England Patriots:
On a brutally cold night with temperatures barely above zero and wind chills well below zero, the Titans and Patriots faced off in a grinder. A 41-yard Tom Brady touchdown to Bethel Johnson was answered with a Titans drive ending in a 5-yard Chris Brown rushing score. Both Gary Anderson and Adam Vinatieri missed field goal tries in the bitter cold, but Vinatieri broke a 14-all tie with 4:06 to go with a 46-yard field goal. Having used all their timeouts, and after a controversial intentional grounding call, the Titans were forced to go for a long throw on 4th and 12 at the Patriots 42 in the game's final two minutes; as a Patriots blitz stormed through McNair unloaded a desperation heave; Drew Bennett, who had just made two incredible sideline catches, was surrounded by Patriots as he jumped for the ball, but it bounced off his fingers for a game-deciding incompletion, a 17–14 Patriots win and a bitter ending to the Titans season. It was the last playoff game for Steve McNair as the team's starting quarterback (he made the playoffs as the Ravens starting quarterback in 2006) and the final game Eddie George would play in a Titans uniform. The Titans would not face the Patriots in the playoffs again until splitting a two-game series in the 2017-19 period.

Playoffs 
See also 2003–04 NFL playoffs

Wild Card vs Ravens

AFC: Tennessee Titans 20, Baltimore Ravens 17 

In a defensive struggle, Gary Anderson kicked the winning 46-yard field goal for the Titans with 29 seconds left. The winning kick was set up after a 15-yard unnecessary roughness penalty on Ravens offensive lineman Orlando Brown Sr. forced Baltimore to punt and enabled Tennessee to start its final drive from its own 37-yard line. Titans quarterback Steve McNair threw three interceptions. Meanwhile, the Ravens running back Jamal Lewis, the league's regular season rushing leader, was limited to 35 yards on 14 carries.

On the Titans opening drive of the game, McNair completed passes to Drew Bennett and Frank Wycheck for gains of 17 and 14 yards, while Eddie George rushed five times for 25 yards on a 10-play, 67-yard drive. Running back Chris Brown finished the drive with a 6-yard touchdown run to give Tennessee a 7–0 lead. The Ravens were forced to punt on their ensuing drive, but three plays later, safety Ed Reed tipped a pass from McNair into the arms of cornerback Will Demps, who returned it 56 yards for a touchdown.

Early in the second quarter, a 15-yard punt return from Titans receiver Derrick Mason gave his team the ball at the Ravens 35-yard line. McNair then led them to the 17-yard line, but Reed intercepted a pass from him and returned it 23 yards to the 29. After an exchange of punts, Ravens quarterback Anthony Wright completed four passes for 56 yards and rushed for 11, setting up a 43-yard field goal by Matt Stover giving Baltimore a 10–7 halftime lead.

Midway through the third quarter, McNair's 49-yard touchdown pass to Justin McCareins gave the Titans a 14–10 lead. Then in the fourth quarter, Tennessee defense back Samari Rolle intercepted a pass from Wright at the Ravens 30-yard line, setting up a 45-yard field goal from Anderson. But Wright led Baltimore back, completing five passes for 80 yards on their ensuing drive. Tight end Todd Heap caught three of Wright's passes for 55 yards, and finished the drive with a leaping 35-yard catch in the back of the end zone to tie the game.

After an exchange of punts, the Titans took the ball on their own 37-yard line and drove 35 yards to Ravens 28-yard line where Anderson's 46-yard field goal with 33 seconds left gave them the win. This would be the Titans last playoff win until 2017.

References 

2003
Tennessee Titans
Titans